Bruflat is the administrative centre of Etnedal Municipality in Innlandet county, Norway.

The village originally belonged to Sør-Aurdal municipality, but on 1 January 1894 the whole parish was split away, together with Nord-Etnedal parish, to create the new Etnedal municipality.

References

Etnedal
Villages in Innlandet